Philip Arthur Barker (22 August 1920 – 2001) was a British archaeologist who was most famous for his work on excavation methodology.

Education 
He left school with no qualifications and served in the RAF during the Second World War before he trained as a teacher. He taught Art at the Priory Grammar School for Boys, Shrewsbury and established a flourishing archaeological society at the school, which conducted a large number of excavations in the area, including a section of the town walls at Roushill in Shrewsbury.

Career 
His interest in archaeology led him to become an academic at the University of Birmingham. For many years, he was the archaeologist at Worcester Cathedral.

During the 1970s and the 1980s, he worked to help establish Rescue and the Institute of Field Archaeologists and undertook excavation work at Wroxeter and Hen Domen. He served as the Chair of the Clwyd-Powys Archaeological Trust from 1984 to 1991.

He wrote the comprehensive guide to field archaeology, Techniques of Archaeological Excavation, in 1977, and it remains in print.

Barker specialised in castle studies and in 1987 was a founding member of the Castle Studies Group. The excavations at Hen Domen led to the publication of a book about the project and another about timber castles more broadly, jointly written with Robert Higham.

References

Bibliography 

 Chris Musson and Charles Hill. "Philip Barker 1920–2001." Council for British Archaeology, Wales. , Spring 2001.
  by Robert Higham.

External links 

 

1920 births
2001 deaths
English archaeologists
Castellologists
Academics of the University of Birmingham
Royal Air Force personnel of World War II